This is the discography of South Korean-Canadian rapper, songwriter, record producer Tablo. His debut solo album, Fever's End, was released in 2011.

Extended plays

Singles

As lead artist

Promotional singles

As collaboration

As featured artist

Other charted songs

Guest appearances

Produced songs
 2004: "이력서" (Dynamic Duo)
 2004: "Sky High" (Nonstop 4 soundtrack)
 2005: "Campus Love Story"  (Cho PD)
 2006: "내일은 오니까" (Paloalto & The Quiett)
 2006: "남자라서 웃어요" (Kim Jang Hoon featuring Mithra Jin)
 2006: "Never Know" (by Lim Jeong Hee)
 2006: "Rain Bow" (Infinity Flow)
 2007: "여자라서 웃어요" (Sim Soo-bong featuring Mithra Jin)
 2007: "Talk Play Love" (Anyband)
 2012: "Style" (Rania)
 2013: "Turn it up" (Lee Hi)
 2013: "Special" (Lee Hi)
 2013: "Fool" (Lee Hi)
 2014: "Rise" (Taeyang)
 2014: "Let go" (Taeyang)
 2014: "Love you to death" (Taeyang)
 2015: "Daydream" (INFINITE 's Sunggyu featuring Borderline: Tablo & Nell's Kim Jong-wan)
 2016: "Hashtag" (Younha) 
 2016: "Three words" (Sechskies)
 2016: "Couple" (Sechskies) (uncredited)
 2016: "Up All Night" (Lee Hi featuring Tablo)
 2016: "Blues" (Lee Hi)
 2016: "Missing You" (Lee Hi)
 2016: "You" (Winner's Seungyoon) 
 2017: "Sad Song" (Sechskies)
 2017: "Be Well" (Sechskies)
 2017: "Drinking Problem" (Sechskies)
 2018: "Hug Me" (iKON)
 2019: "Song Request"  Lee So-ra featuring Suga

References

Discographies of South Korean artists